Svenja Anette Huth (born 25 January 1991) is a German footballer who plays for VfL Wolfsburg and the Germany national team.

Club career

1. FFC Frankfurt
Huth made her Bundesliga debut on 24 February 2008 for 1. FFC Frankfurt.  She earned her first Bundesliga title at the end of her debut season.

Turbine Potsdam
Huth played for the German side Turbine Potsdam for the 2015–16 season.

International career

She was part of the squad for the 2016 Summer Olympics, where Germany won the gold medal.

Career statistics

Scores and results list Germany's goal tally first, score column indicates score after each Huth goal.

Honours
FFC Frankfurt
Bundesliga: 2007–08
UEFA Women's Champions League: 2007–08, 2014–15
DFB-Pokal: 2007–08, 2010–11, 2013–14

VfL Wolfsburg
Bundesliga: 2019–20, 2021–22
DFB-Pokal: 2019–20, 2020–21, 2021–22

Germany
UEFA Women's Championship: 2013, runner-up: 2022
Algarve Cup: 2012
Summer Olympic Games: Gold medal 2016

Germany U20
FIFA U-20 Women's World Cup: 2010

Germany U17
UEFA Women's Under-17 Championship: 2008

Individual
Fritz Walter Medal: Gold 2010
Silbernes Lorbeerblatt: 2016

Private life 
Since June 2022 Huth is married.

References

External links

Svenja Huth's DFB profile (German)

1991 births
Living people
People from Alzenau
Sportspeople from Lower Franconia
German women's footballers
Germany women's international footballers
Women's association football forwards
1. FFC Frankfurt players
1. FFC Turbine Potsdam players
Footballers from Bavaria
Olympic gold medalists for Germany
Olympic medalists in football
Footballers at the 2016 Summer Olympics
Medalists at the 2016 Summer Olympics
Frauen-Bundesliga players
Olympic footballers of Germany
UEFA Women's Championship-winning players
2019 FIFA Women's World Cup players
VfL Wolfsburg (women) players
UEFA Women's Euro 2022 players
German LGBT sportspeople
LGBT association football players
Lesbian sportswomen
21st-century LGBT people
UEFA Women's Euro 2017 players